McKinley Middle School may refer to:

McKinley Middle School, Albuquerque, New Mexico; included in List of middle schools in Albuquerque
McKinley Middle School, Flint, Michigan; operated by Flint Community Schools
McKinley Middle School (Racine, Wisconsin)